Georges Douking (born Georges Ladoubée; 6 August 1902 – 20 October 1987) was a French stage, film, and television actor. He also directed stage plays such as the premier presentation of Jean Giraudoux's Sodom and Gomorrah at the Théâtre Hébertot in 1943.  He is perhaps best known for his role in the surreal 1972 comedy The Discreet Charm of the Bourgeoisie. He was one of the favorite actors of the French filmmaker Pierre Chenal.

Douking appeared in more than 75 films between 1934 and 1981.

Partial filmography

1934: Street Without a Name
1935: Crime and Punishment (directed by Pierre Chenal) - Nicolas
1935: The Green Domino
1936: Razumov: Sous les yeux d'occident - (uncredited)
1937: The Man from Nowhere - Le domestique simplet de la pension
1938: La Femme du bout du monde - Planque
1938: The Lafarge Case - Parent
1938: Les gaietés de l'exposition - Le deuxième détective
1938: The Train for Venice - Le barman
1938: Éducation de prince - Pausanias
1938: Katia - L'espion
1938: J'accuse! (directed by Abel Gance)
1939: Eusèbe député - Firmin
1939: Les Otages - Brazoux
1939: Louise - Un peintre (uncredited)
1939: Le Dernier Tournant - Un joueur
1939: Yamilé sous les cèdres - Ahmed
1939: Deuxième bureau contre kommandantur
1939: Le Jour Se Lève (directed by Marcel Carné) - L'aveugle (uncredited)
1939: La Charrette fantôme - Un ivrogne (uncredited)
1943: La Main du diable - Le tire-laine (uncredited)
1943: Tornavara - Gregor
1943: Finance noire
1943: Un seul amour - Le père Biondi
1943: Adrien - Le peintre
1948: Clochemerle - Le préparateur
1949:  Maya - Un soutier
1950: Lady Paname - Le parlementaire - un ami de Fred
1951: Savage Triangle - Le paysan
1952: Judgement of God (directed by Raymond Bernard) - Le moine Enrique - commissaire de l'inquisition
1956: The Hunchback of Notre Dame (directed by Jean Delannoy) - A Thief
1957: Œil pour œil - Le guérisseur
1958: Rafles sur la ville - Le fou
1958: La Bonne Tisane - Bob
1959: Ce corps tant désiré - Le commissaire
1959: La bête à l'affût - Le gardien du phare
1959: Le Bossu (directed by André Hunebelle) - Le marquis de Caylus
1960: Jack of Spades - Le vieux Manuel
1961: Five Day Lover
1964: Joy House (directed by René Clément) - Clochard
1964: Tintin and the Blue Oranges - Le photographe à Moulinsart (uncredited)
1965: What's New, Pussycat? (directed by Clive Donner) - Concierge at Renee's Apartment (uncredited)
1966: The Poppy Is Also a Flower - Financier of Marko (uncredited)
1966: Mademoiselle (directed by Tony Richardson) - The Priest
1966: Triple Cross - Polish Interrogator
1968: The Charge of the Light Brigade (directed by Tony Richardson) - Marshall St. Arnaud
1968: Spirits of the Dead (directed by Federico Fellini, Louis Malle, and Roger Vadim) - Le licier (segment "Metzengerstein")
1969: The Milky Way (directed by Luis Buñuel) - Le berger avec la chèvre
1969: Dandy (directed by Sergio Gobbi) - Un gêolier
1969: The Christmas Tree - L'animalier
1969: The Potatoes (directed by Claude Autant-Lara) - Voisin de P'tit Louis
1970: Sortie de secours
1971: The Great Mafia... (directed by Philippe Clair)
1972: Le droit d'aimer - Prisoner
1972: The Discreet Charm of the Bourgeoisie (directed by Luis Buñuel) - Gardener
1974: The Four Musketeers Chariot (directed by André Hunebelle)
1974: The Bidasses to Go to War (directed by Claude Zidi) - Le papé
1976: Les conquistadores - Le vieux

References

External links
 Georges Douking at Allmovie
 

1902 births
1987 deaths
French male film actors
French male stage actors
French male television actors
20th-century French male actors